Buchanan is a village located in the town of Cortlandt in Westchester County, New York, United States. The population was 2,230 as of the 2010 census.

The now decommissioned Indian Point nuclear power facility is located in Buchanan. The 2000 Rockefeller Center Christmas tree also came from Buchanan. The 80-foot tall Norway spruce was donated by Bill and Frances Heady after its execution. Bill Heady planted the tree in 1950.

Geography

Demographics

As of the census of 2000, there were 2,189 people, 814 households, and 609 families residing in the village. The population density was 1,579.3 people per square mile (608.0/km2). There were 912 housing units at an average density of 658.0 per square mile (253.3/km2). The racial makeup of the village was 96.21% white, 0.69% African American, 0.18% Native American, 1.19% Asian, 0.78% from other races, and 0.96% from two or more races. Hispanic or Latino of any race were 3.47% of the population.

There were 814 households, out of which 36.4% had children under the age of 18 living with them, 60.0% were married couples living together, 11.1% had a female householder with no husband present, and 25.1% were non-families. 21.9% of all households were made up of individuals, and 8.7% had someone living alone who was 65 years of age or older. The average household size was 2.67 and the average family size was 3.12.

In the village, the population was spread out, with 24.5% under the age of 18, 7.1% from 18 to 24, 32.1% from 25 to 44, 23.5% from 45 to 64, and 12.8% who were 65 years of age or older. The median age was 38 years. For every 100 females, there were 99.7 males. For every 100 females age 18 and over, there were 99.2 males.

The median income for a household in the village was $62,604, and the median income for a family was $73,674. Males had a median income of $50,964 versus $33,667 for females. The per capita income for the village was $29,975. About 2.2% of families and 3.9% of the population were below the poverty line, including 6.3% of those under age 18 and 1.8% of those age 65 or over.

Buchanan is also the smallest municipality in the world with a nuclear power plant.

Students in the village attend the Buchanan-Verplanck Elementary School or Frank G. Lindsey Elementary School, before moving on to the Blue Mountain Middle School and finally Hendrick Hudson High School. 

The village has its own post office, police force, volunteer fire department—Buchanan Engine Company #1, and is served by Cortlandt Volunteer Ambulance in nearby Montrose.

Notable people of Buchanan 

 Anastasia van Burkalow (1911 – 2004) was an American geographer and hymnologist and Professor Emerita of Hunter College.

External links
Village site

Sources

Villages in New York (state)
Villages in Westchester County, New York
New York (state) populated places on the Hudson River